The Roman Catholic Diocese of Jeju (제주, also romanized Jeju) is a Latin rite suffragan diocese in the ecclesiastical province of the Metropolitan Archdiocese of Gwangju, South Korea, yet depends on the missionary Roman Congregation for the Evangelization of Peoples. Its episcopal see and mother church is Immaculate Conception Cathedral in Jeju City.

History 
It was created on 28 June 1971 by Pope Paul VI as Apostolic Prefecture of Jeju 제주 / Cheju / 濟州 (正體中文) / Cheiuen(sis) (Latin), exempt, on territory split off from the Archdiocese of Gwangju.

It was elevated on 21 March 1977, also by Pope Paul VI to Diocese of Jeju 제주 / Cheju / 濟州 (正體中文) / Cheiuen(sis) (Latin).

Statistics 
As per 2014, it pastorally served 71,845 Catholics (11.9% of 604,670 total) on 1,849 km2 in 27 parishes with 51 priests (44 diocesan, 7 religious), 1 deacon, 110 lay religious (7 brothers, 103 sisters) and 17 seminarians.

Leadership

Ordinaries 
Harold William Henry (28 June 1971 – 1 March 1976; Apostolic Administrator)
Michael Pak Jeong-il (15 April 1977 – 8 June 1982), appointed Bishop of Jeonju
Paul Kim Tchang-ryeol (11 November 1983 – 15 July 2002)
Peter Kang U-il (15 July 2002 – 22 November 2020)
Pius Moon Chang-woo (22 November 2020 – present)

Coadjutor Bishops
Pius Moon Chang-woo (15 August 2017 – 22 November 2020)

See also 
 List of Catholic Dioceses in Korea
 Roman Catholicism in South Korea

References

Sources and external links 
 Official site
 GCatholic - data for all sections
 Catholic-Hierarchy 

Roman Catholic dioceses in South Korea
Jeju Province
Roman Catholic dioceses and prelatures established in the 20th century
Religious organizations established in 1971
Roman Catholic Ecclesiastical Province of Gwangju